Narodna stranka may refer to:
 People's Party (1990), a defunct political party in Serbia
 People's Party (2017), a political party in Serbia